The Kyiv Regional Committee of the Communist Party of Ukraine, commonly referred to as the Kyiv CPU obkom, was the position of highest authority in Kyiv Oblast during most of the existence of the Soviet Union. The position was created on 27 February 1932, and abolished in August 1991 although most authority was lost in June that year to the position of Governor of Kyiv Oblast. The First Secretary was a de facto appointed position usually by the Central Committee the Communist Party of Ukraine or the First Secretary of the Republic.

First Secretaries
The following individuals served as first secretaries of the Kyiv Regional Committee of the Communist Party of Ukraine.

Notes

See also
Governor of Kyiv Oblast
Kyiv City Committee of the Communist Party of Ukraine
Kyiv Gubernatorial Committee of the Communist Party of Ukraine

References

Sources
 World Statesmen.org

Regional Committees of the Communist Party of Ukraine (Soviet Union)
Ukrainian Soviet Socialist Republic
History of Kyiv Oblast
1932 establishments in the Soviet Union
1991 disestablishments in the Soviet Union